The Yakovlev Yak-43 was a Soviet VTOL (vertical takeoff and landing) fighter designed as the ground-based version of the ill-fated Yakovlev Yak-141, which failed to reach production. Like the Yak-141, the Yak-43 did not reach production. The Yak-43 would have been the third-generation VTOL/STOL fighter, to follow and eventually replace the Yak-141.

Design and development
Like the Yak-141, the Yak-43 would have had only a single main engine, as well as two dedicated vertical-lift engines. This same engine is used to power the Tupolev Tu-160 Blackjack bomber. The engine would have had a large air bleed leading to an auxiliary combustion chamber located in the nose, though a separate lift jet would have been retained. A new integral layout use stealth technology which is a single whole of the fuselage with the wing. After the Yak-43 project was unsuccessful, another attempt was made for a supersonic VTOL aircraft. But also the successor, the Yak-201 never left the drawing board.

See also

References
Notes

Bibliography

 Gunston, Bill. Yakovlev Aircraft since 1924. London, UK: Putnam Aeronautical Books, 1997. .

External links

 Hayles, John. "Yakovlev Yak-41 'Freestyle'". Aeroflight, 28 March 2005. Retrieved: 3 July 2008.

Stealth aircraft
Carrier-based aircraft
Abandoned military aircraft projects of the Soviet Union
Lift jet
Yak-043